Dancing Man is a 1934 American pre-Code mystery film directed by Albert Ray and starring Reginald Denny, Judith Allen and  Edmund Breese. Allen was loaned out from Paramount Pictures where she was under contract.

Synopsis
Paul Drexel makes his living as a taxi dancer escorting wealthy woman to dance halls. He meets and falls in love with Diane Trevor, but then to her horror she discovers that he one of his previous clients was her stepmother, Tamara. When Tamara is found murdered, all suspicions seem to point towards Drexel.

Cast
 Reginald Denny as Paul Drexel
 Judith Allen as 	Diane Trevor
 Edmund Breese as J.C. Trevor
 Natalie Moorhead as 	Tamara Trevor
 Edwin Maxwell as 	Morton Randall
 Douglas Cosgrove as 	Donovan
 Robert Ellis as 	Cavendish
 Charlotte Merriam as 	Celestine Castle
 Huntley Gordon as 	Mason
 Maude Truax as Mrs. St. John
 Donald Stuart as Eddie Stryker

References

Bibliography
 Langman, Larry & Finn, Daniel. A Guide to American Crime Films of the Thirties. Greenwood Press, 1995.
 Pitts, Michael R. Poverty Row Studios, 1929–1940. McFarland & Company, 2005.

External links
 

1934 films
1934 crime films
1934 mystery films
American mystery films
American crime films
Films directed by Albert Ray
American black-and-white films
1930s English-language films
1930s American films